The New York Evening Post Building, also known as the New York Post Building or the Post Towers, is a historic commercial building located in Lower Manhattan, New York City, New York. The building was designed by architect Horace Trumbauer and built in 1926.

The Post Building is a 17-story, Art Deco style steel frame and masonry building with abundant terra cotta and Guastavino tile embellishments.  The building has setbacks beginning at the seventh floor and a "U" shaped light well. The New York Evening Post previously occupied the Old New York Evening Post Building from 1906 to 1926.  It occupied this building, which is now an apartment building, until 1970. The building was added to the National Register of Historic Places on September 22, 2000.

See also
National Register of Historic Places listings in Manhattan below 14th Street

References

External links

Official website
New York Evening Post Building on Emporis

Office buildings on the National Register of Historic Places in Manhattan
Commercial buildings completed in 1926
Art Deco architecture in Manhattan
Office buildings in Manhattan
Financial District, Manhattan
Newspaper headquarters in the United States
West Side Highway
New York Post